Machimus is a genus of flies in the family Asilidae, the robber flies and assassin flies. They can be found nearly worldwide, except in Australia and New Zealand. Most are native to the Palearctic realm and southern Asia.

As of 2013 there were approximately 188 described species in the genus.

Species include:

Machimus aberrans
Machimus adustus
Machimus annulipes
Machimus antennatus
Machimus antimachus
Machimus aradensis
Machimus aridalis
Machimus arthriticus
Machimus autumnalis
Machimus barcelonicus
Machimus biljici
Machimus blantoni
Machimus blascoi
Machimus caliginosus
Machimus callidus
Machimus carolinae
Machimus chrysitis
Machimus cinerarius
Machimus cingulatus
Machimus citus	 
Machimus coleus
Machimus concinnus
Machimus cowini – Manx robber fly
Machimus cribratus
Machimus cyanopus
Machimus debilis
Machimus delusus
Machimus dubiosus
Machimus elegans
Machimus erythocnemius
Machimus fattigi
Machimus fimbriatus
Machimus floridensis
Machimus formosus
Machimus fortis
Machimus frosti
Machimus gilvipes
Machimus globifer
Machimus gonatistes
Machimus griseus
Machimus hinei
Machimus hubbelli
Machimus ibizensis
Machimus idiorrhytmicus
Machimus javieri
Machimus johnsoni
Machimus krueperi
Machimus lacinulatus
Machimus latapex
Machimus lecythus
Machimus linearis
Machimus longipenis	 
Machimus lucentinus
Machimus madeirensis
Machimus maneei
Machimus margaretae
Machimus modestus
Machimus monticola
Machimus nahalalensis
Machimus nevadensis
Machimus nigrifemoratus
Machimus notatus	 
Machimus notialis	 
Machimus novaescotiae
Machimus occidentalis
Machimus paropus
Machimus pilipes
Machimus portosanctanus
Machimus prairiensis
Machimus pyrenaicus
Machimus rubidus
Machimus rusticus
Machimus sadyates
Machimus sanctimontis
Machimus sareptanus
Machimus setibarbus
Machimus setiventris
Machimus snowii
Machimus stanfordae
Machimus subdolus
Machimus tephraeus
Machimus thoracius
Machimus vescus
Machimus virginicus

References

External links

Asilinae
Asilidae genera